Cosmosoma festivum, the festivum wasp moth, is a moth of the family Erebidae. It was described by Francis Walker in 1854. It is found in Mexico, Guatemala, Belize, Costa Rica and Honduras. It has also been recorded in southern Florida and southern Texas.

Adults exhibit considerable sexual dimorphism.

References

festivum
Moths described in 1854